The IDF Spokesperson's Unit (Dover Tsahal, abbr. Dotz) is the unit in the IDF Operations Directorate, responsible for information policy and media relations. The unit is led by the IDF Spokesperson, a brigadier general and member of the General Staff, and by the Deputy Spokesperson, a colonel. The current Spokesperson is Brig. Gen. Ran Kochav.

Mandate and objectives
The IDF Spokesperson's Unit is responsible for the IDF's information policy and media relations in both peace and war time. According to its mission statement the purpose of the unit is "to report on the accomplishments and activities of the IDF to the Israeli and international public, to nurture public confidence in the IDF, and to serve as the IDF's primary professional authority on matters of public relations and distribution of information to the public".

The IDF Spokesperson's Unit was established as the liaison between the IDF and the domestic and foreign media and general public. The unit performs a variety of functions, including serving as the spokesperson for the IDF to domestic and foreign media, developing and implementing IDF public relations policies, disseminating military related information to the public, instructing IDF personnel in matters pertaining to public relations, and developing relationships with media outlets and accompanying them to military events. The unit services some 500 media outlets and 2500 journalists and civilian agents, addressing over 2000 inquiries a month.

The unit is also a key player for the public diplomacy efforts of the State of Israel. Indeed the 2015 IDF military doctrine highlights the strategic importance of using the power of the media. Economic, legal, media, and political aspects are considered as part of the military approach as much as military combat. Since 2008, the IDF has increasingly also invested in a strong presence on the most important social media platforms. In the meantime, the English-speaking Facebook page of the IDF is one of the most followed social media representations of armies worldwide. 

By charter, the unit is forbidden from engaging in psychological warfare and from the dissemination of falsified information.

History

The IDF Spokesperson's Unit was founded in 1948 with the creation of the State of Israel and the Israel Defense Forces. The first IDF Spokesman was Lt. Col. Moshe Pearlman, a journalist and immigrant from Britain who was appointed in 1948 with the establishment of the State. After the first several years of activity, the IDF Spokesperson's office was upgraded to unit status, under the authority of the Military Intelligence Directorate of the IDF. It was further upgraded to a full brigade in 1973.

In 1979, Brigadier General Yaakov Even opened the film and photography departments in the IDF Spokesperson's Unit which in turn opened the first International School for Combat Journalism and Photography in 2007.

During the Gulf War in the 1990s, the IDF Spokesperson's Unit was repositioned to directly report to the IDF Chief of Staff. The head of the unit at the time, Brig. Gen. Nachman Shai, changed the unit's uniform tag to the one it has today. It was later placed under the Operations Directorate during changes to the army made in 2000. In the year 2006, the Chief of Staff concentrated the Spokesperson's Unit as the professional military authority in matters of public relations. Within this concentrated framework, new branches, fields, and positions were opened within the unit.

Despite its presence on the front lines since 1948, the unit has only suffered one combat fatality, Sergeant Lior Ziv, a photographer who was killed during military operations in 2003.

The IDF Spokesperson's Unit commonly use a member of their staff to address the media. Lt. Col. Peter Lerner of the IDF is currently employed by the unit when addressing British and English speaking news agencies, he was born and educated in London.

Structure

The unit has become the largest spokesperson unit in Israel. It counts more than 400 officers, civilians and soldiers. Additionally, a reserve unit of almost 1,200 soldiers and officers exists. The unit is headed by a Brigadier General and reports to the IDF's Operations Directorate. It is also represented on the IDF General Staff Forum and is directly subordinate to the Chief of the General Staff. The unit is divided into several sub-units which deal with various areas of activity including domestic and foreign press liaison, public relations, information, photography, film, video, organization and training:

IDF Spokesperson: The IDF Spokesperson heads the IDF Spokesperson Unit and holds the rank of Tat Aluf (Brigadier General). The IDF Spokesperson is subordinate to the Chief of the Operations Branch, who holds the rank of Aluf (Major General), and is a member of the IDF General Staff Forum. The current IDF Spokesperson is Brigadier General Ronen Manelis, who replaced former Spokesperson Moti Almoz in 2017. 
Israeli Media Branch: Responsible for the daily management of communication with various media outlets for specific target audiences. Large-circulation Israeli newspapers such as Yedioth Aharonoth, Maariv and Haaretz, as well as smaller newspapers, religious media, radio and internet sources, are all assisted by the Communications Branch on military and security matters.
International Media Branch: Responsible for the administration of IDF communications with international media outlets, and for shaping the image of the IDF in the foreign public arena. Through the different desks – the News Desk; North American Desk; European Desk; Latin American and Asian Desk; Arabic Language Desk; and Russian Language Desk – the Foreign Press Branch fields requests and inquiries from foreign news media. In June 2009 a New Media Desk was set up in order to deal with the growing interest from bloggers and various social media networks. Since the desk's formation there has been a marked increase in the IDF Spokesperson Unit's online presence, through such venues as an official blog, a YouTube account, and a Twitter feed, with the goal of being more accessible and open to popular international audiences. The current head of the International Media Branch is Lt. Col. Jonathan Conricus. As of 2017, the branch has alone 15 staff members that are only responsible for taking care of the social media platforms used by the IDF to reach out to audiences abroad. As of 2015, the IDF is active on 30 different social media platforms.
The Public Affairs Branch: This branch is responsible for the IDF's direct, unmediated relationship with the public, both in Israel and around the world. The branch is split into three different units—the Military-Society Department, responsible for the Israeli public's access to the IDF; the Jewish Organizations and Foreign Governments Department, responsible for those groups' access to the IDF; and the Public Correspondence Department, responsible for responding to public requests for information, including under Israel's Freedom of Information Law.
The Operations Branch: The nerve center of the army's real-time public relations information system. This branch, specializing in real-time, operational PR, operates 24/7 and is responsible for all outgoing IDF Spokesperson press releases. To ensure rapid PR response to developing events, this branch maintains constant communication with IDF forces in the field, through an extensive network of representatives in each regional headquarters. The branch also contains a media monitoring and analysis department.
IDF Spokesperson Film Unit: This unit is responsible for the production of military public relations material. One of the unit's most famous productions was "Two Fingers from Sidon," a film about Israeli soldiers in Lebanon released in 1985. More recent productions include footage from the Gaza flotilla raid which occurred May 31, 2010, and which provided a hitherto-unseen angle of the operation. The unit is made up of seven departments: The IDF Website, Still Photography, Video Photography, Video Editing, Video Archives, Production and Post-Production.
Research, Strategies & Initiatives Branch: Responsible for drafting IDF strategic messages and conducting research and analysis on message effectivity. Serves as senior consultant to IDF and Spokesman in all strategic PR issues, both long- and short-term. Operations of this branch are led by a Lt. Col. and international operations are handled in consultation with a staff of former combat reservists with significant field experience. The branch is split into two primary departments: Research and Strategy.
The Training Branch: The branch is responsible for professional training of IDF personnel in media relations. It is composed mainly of two main parts: the Department of Doctrine and Drills, and the School of Communications, which is located in the Dayan base in the Glilot region and is responsible for the communication training of senior IDF commanders.
Brigade Operations & Human Resources Branch: Provides logistics, organization and administration for all the brigade's operations.

Leaders

1948–1952: Lt. Col. Moshe Pearlman
1952–1953: Lt. Col. Aminadav Fry
1953–1955: Col. Nahman Karni
1955–1957: Col. Nehemiah Brosh
1957–1959: Lt. Col. Shaul Ramati
1959–1963: Lt. Col. Dov Sinai
1963–1967: Col. Aryeh Shalev
1967–1969: Col. Rafael Efrat
1969–1973: Col. Yossi Calev
1973–1974: Brig. Gen. Pinhas Lahav
1974–1975: Brig. Gen. Efraim Poran
1975–1976: Brig. Gen. Dov Sion
1976–1977: Brig. Gen. Yoel Ben Porat
1977–1979: Col. Yitzhak Golan
1979–1984: Brig. Gen. Ya'akov Even
1984–1989: Brig. Gen. Efraim Lapid
1989–1991: Brig. Gen. Nachman Shai
1991–1994: Brig. Gen. Eilan Tal
1994–1996: Brig. Gen. Amos Gilad
1996–1999: Brig. Gen. Oded Ben Ami
2000–2002: Brig. Gen. Ron Kitri
2002–2005: Brig. Gen. Ruth Yaron (First Woman to Lead Unit)
2005–2007: Brig. Gen. Miri Regev
2007–2011: Brig. Gen. Avi Benayahu
2011–2013: Brig. Gen. Yoav Mordechai
2013–2017: Brig. Gen. Moti Almoz
2017-2019: Brig. Gen. Ronen Manelis
 2019-2021: Brig. Gen: Hidai Zilberman
2021-present: Brig. Gen: Ran Kochav

See also
 Public diplomacy of Israel
 Israeli Defense Forces

References

External links

IDF Official Website (English)
IDF Official Youtube Channel
IDF Spokesperson's Twitter Account
IDF Flickr Stream, Flickr

Military units and formations of Israel